Hywel, sometimes anglicised as Howel or Howell, is a Welsh masculine given name. It may refer to:

Saint Hywel, a sixth-century disciple of Saint Teilo and the king of Brittany in the Arthurian legend.
Hywel ap Rhodri Molwynog, 9th-century king of Gwynedd
Hywel Dda or Hywel the Good (died 950), king of Deheubarth and much of the rest of Wales, famed as a lawgiver
Huwal of the West Welsh, 10th-century Welsh king, possibly identical to Hywel Dda
Hywel ab Owain Gwynedd (died 1170), Welsh poet and military leader
Syr Hywel y Fwyall or Sir Hywel ap Gruffudd (fl. 1356–died 1381), Welsh knight
Hywel Bennett (1944–2017), Welsh actor
Hywel David Evans (1924–2019), Australian politician
Hywel Evans (figure skater) (born 1945), Welsh figure skater
Hywel Francis (1946–2021), Welsh historian and politician; MP for Aberavon
Hywel Griffith, BBC Wales news correspondent
Hywel Harris (1714–1773), Welsh Methodist preacher
Hywel Williams (born 1953), Welsh politician; MP for Arfon
With the spelling Howel:
Howel Brown (1856–1928), Glasgow cathedral provost
Howel Davies (c. 1716–1770), Welsh Methodist minister
Frank Howel Evans (1867–1931), Welsh author
Edward Howel Francis (1924–2014), British geologist and emeritus professor
Howel Gwyn (1806–1888), British politician
Howel Harris Hughes (1873–1956), Welsh theologian and clergyman
Howel Samuel (1881–1953), British politician
Howel Williams (1898–1980), American geologist and volcanologist

See also
 Hoel (disambiguation), the Breton form of this name
 Howell, a surname derived from this name
 Howel, Kentucky, an unincorporated community
 Howel–Evans syndrome

Welsh masculine given names